Thermoscelis is a genus of ground beetles in the family Carabidae. This genus has a single species, Thermoscelis insignis. It is found in the countries Georgia, Russia, and Turkey.

References

Platyninae